Marion Barron (born 28 March 1958) is a Scottish actress. She is best known for playing the vicar's wife in the successful BBC sitcom, Keeping Up Appearances from 1990 to 1995. Other notable works include Don't Wait Up (1983) and Screen Two (1985).

Early life
Marion Barron was born on 28 March 1958 in British Nigeria. She grew up Dumfries, Scotland.

Career
Barron's first screen credit was as a hotel receptionist in the successful sitcom Don't Wait Up, starring Nigel Havers, Tony Britton and Dinah Sheridan, and was produced and directed by Harold Snoad, but her best known role was as the timid yet fiery vicar's wife alongside Patricia Routledge, Josephine Tewson, Clive Swift and Judy Cornwell in the BBC's hit sitcom Keeping Up Appearances (also produced and directed by Harold Snoad) from 1990 to 1995. She has also appeared in Screen Two and The Bill.

Television roles

Personal life
Marion is married to Simon Fuller and they have two children.

References

External links

1958 births
Living people
Scottish television actresses
People from Dumfries
20th-century Scottish actresses
21st-century Scottish actresses